Aq Qaleh (also Romanized as Āq Qal‘eh) is a village in Qushkhaneh-ye Bala Rural District, Qushkhaneh District, Shirvan County, North Khorasan Province, Iran. At the 2006 census, its population was 168, in 42 families.

References 

Populated places in Shirvan County